The OneZoom Tree of Life Explorer is a web-based phylogenetic tree software. It aims to map the evolutionary connection of all known life. As of 2023 it includes over 2.2 million species.

Organisation 
OneZoom was originally invented by James Rosindell and is a charity registered in London. It is sponsored by individuals such as Richard Dawkins.

Tree of Life Explorer 
The design is based on the pythagoras tree; beside a default spiral design there are other options, such as polytomy.

Leaves and nodes provide links to other websites, such as Wikipedia, Encyclopedia of Life or the NCBI taxonomy browser. The leaves representing single species are colour-coded according to their IUCN extinction risk, with red indicating a threatened species, black representing a recently extinct species, and grey representing species with unknown extinction risk.

See also 
 List of phylogenetic tree visualization software

References

External links 

 OneZoom Tree of Life Explorer
 Interview with Luke Harmon in Utah Public Radio

Charities based in London
Phylogenetics software
Visualization software
Tree of life (biology)
Educational charities based in the United Kingdom
International charities